The style Lord Kirkwood has been borne by:

 Ian Kirkwood, Lord Kirkwood (1932–2017), Scottish lawyer and judge
 Archy Kirkwood, Baron Kirkwood of Kirkhope (born 1946), Liberal Democrat politician